Veterans Highway may refer to:

 A former alignment of Maryland Route 3 and U.S. Route 301, that now runs parallel to Interstate 97 in Anne Arundel County, Maryland
South Carolina Highway 22 in Horry County, South Carolina

See also
 Veterans Memorial Highway
 Veterans Parkway (disambiguation)
 Vietnam Veterans Memorial Highway (disambiguation)
 Veterans Memorial Parkway, London, Ontario